A synthetic language uses inflection or agglutination to express syntactic relationships within a sentence. Inflection is the addition of morphemes to a root word that assigns grammatical property to that word, while agglutination is the combination of two or more morphemes into one word. The information added by morphemes can include indications of a word's grammatical category, such as whether a word is the subject or object in the sentence. Morphology can be either relational or derivational.

While a derivational morpheme changes the lexical categories of words, an inflectional morpheme does not. In the first example below, the adjective fast followed by the suffix -er yields faster, which is still an adjective. However, the verb teach followed by the suffix -er yields teacher, which is a noun. The first case is an example of inflection and the latter derivation.

 fast (adjective, positive) vs. faster (adjective, comparative)
 teach (verb) vs. teacher (noun)

In synthetic languages, there is a higher morpheme-to-word ratio than in analytic languages. Analytic languages have a lower morpheme-to-word ratio, higher use of auxiliary verbs, and greater reliance on word order to convey grammatical information. The two subtypes of synthetic languages are agglutinating languages and fusional languages. These can be further divided into polysynthetic languages (most polysynthetic languages are agglutinative, although Navajo and other Athabaskan languages are often classified as fusional) and oligosynthetic languages.

Forms of synthesis
Language exhibits synthesis in two ways: derivational and relational morphology. These methods of synthesis refer to the ways in which morphemes, the smallest grammatical units in a language, are bound together. Derivational and relational morphology represent opposite ends of a spectrum; that is, a single word in a given language may exhibit varying degrees of both of them simultaneously. Similarly, some words may have derivational morphology while others have relational morphology. Some linguists, however, consider relational morphology to be a type of derivational morphology, which may complicate the classification.

Derivational synthesis
In derivational synthesis, morphemes of different types (nouns, verbs, affixes, etc.) are joined to create new words. That is, in general, the morphemes being combined are more concrete units of meaning. The morphemes being synthesized in the following examples either belong to a particular grammatical class – such as adjectives, nouns, or prepositions – or are affixes that usually have a single form and meaning:

 German

 This word demonstrates the hierarchical construction of synthetically derived words:
  "members of [the] supervisory board" +  "meeting"
  "supervisory board" + s (Fugen-s) +  "members"
  "supervision" + s +  "council, board"
  "on, up" +  "sight"
  "member" +  plural
  "co-" +  "element, constituent part"
  (a verb prefix of variable meaning) +  "to gather" +  present participle
 Greek

 Polish

 English

 English word chains such as child labour law may count as well, because it is merely an orthographic convention to write them as isolated words. Grammatically and phonetically they behave like one word (stress on the first syllable, plural morpheme at the end).
 Russian

 Malayalam

"such/so + not + has + been + when + occasions + all + exclusively"
"on all such occasions when it has been not so"
 Persian

 Ukrainian

 international classical compounds based on Greek and Latin

 alternately, cholesterol can be read as chole- + + -ol, as in "bile + solid + [alcohol suffix]", or "the solid alcohol present in bile".

Relational synthesis
In relational synthesis, root words are joined to bound morphemes to show grammatical function. In other words, it involves the combination of more abstract units of meaning than derivational synthesis. In the following examples note that many of the morphemes are related to voice (e.g. passive voice), whether a word is in the subject or object of the sentence, possession, plurality, or other abstract distinctions in a language:

 Italian

 Spanish

 Nahuatl

 Latin

 Albanian
 
"give + to me + it[singular] + you[plural] + [imperative mood]"
'You, give it to me'
 Japanese

 Finnish

 Hungarian

 Turkish

 Georgian

The word describes the whole sentence that incorporates tense, subject, object, relation between them, direction of the action, conditional and causative markers etc.

Types of synthetic languages

Agglutinating languages

Agglutinating languages have a high rate of agglutination in their words and sentences, meaning that the morphological construction of words consists of distinct morphemes that usually carry a single unique meaning. These morphemes tend to look the same no matter what word they are in, so it is easy to separate a word into its individual morphemes. Note that morphemes may be bound (that is, they must be attached to a word to have meaning, like affixes) or free (they can stand alone and still have meaning).

Swahili is an agglutinating language. For example, distinct morphemes are used in the conjugation of verbs:
Ni-na-soma: I-present-read or I am reading
U-na-soma: you-present-read or you are reading
A-na-soma: s/he-present-read or s/he is reading

Fusional languages

Fusional languages are similar to agglutinating languages in that they involve the combination of many distinct morphemes. However, morphemes in fusional languages are often assigned several different lexical meanings, and they tend to be fused together so that it is difficult to separate individual morphemes from one another.

Polysynthetic

Polysynthetic languages are considered the most synthetic of the three types because they combine multiple stems as well as other morphemes into a single continuous word. These languages often turn nouns into verbs. Many Native Alaskan and other Native American languages are polysynthetic.

Mohawk: Washakotya'tawitsherahetkvhta'se means "He ruined her dress" (strictly, 'He made the-thing-that-one-puts-on-one's body ugly for her'). This one inflected verb in a polysynthetic language expresses an idea that can only be conveyed using multiple words in a more analytic language such as English.

Oligosynthetic
Oligosynthetic languages are a theoretical notion created by Benjamin Whorf. Such languages would be functionally synthetic, but make use of a very limited array of morphemes (perhaps just a few hundred). The concept of an oligosynthetic language type was proposed by Whorf to describe the Native American language Nahuatl, although he did not further pursue this idea. Though no natural language uses this process, it has found its use in the world of constructed languages, in auxlangs such as aUI.

Synthetic and analytic languages
Synthetic languages combine (synthesize) multiple concepts into each word. Analytic languages break up (analyze) concepts into separate words. These classifications comprise two ends of a spectrum along which different languages can be classified. The present-day English is seen as analytic, but it used to be fusional. Certain synthetic qualities (as in the inflection of verbs to show tense) were retained.

The distinction is, therefore, a matter of degree. The most analytic languages, Isolating languages, consistently have one morpheme per word, while at the other extreme, in polysynthetic languages such as some Native American languages a single inflected verb may contain as much information as an entire English sentence.

In order to demonstrate the nature of the isolating-analytic–synthetic–polysynthetic classification as a "continuum", some examples are shown below.

Isolating

 Mandarin lacks inflectional morphology almost entirely, and most words consist of either one- or two-syllable morphemes, especially due to the very numerous compound words.

However, with rare exceptions, each syllable in Mandarin (corresponding to a single written character) represents a morpheme with an identifiable meaning, even if many of such morphemes are bound. This gives rise to the common misconception that Chinese consists exclusively of "words of one syllable". As the sentence above illustrates, however,  even  simple Chinese words   such as míngtiān 'tomorrow' (míng "next" + tīan "day") and péngyou 'friend' (a compound of péng and yǒu, both of which mean 'friend') are  synthetic compound words.

The Chinese language of the Classic works,  and of Confucius for example, is more strictly monosyllabic (and southern dialects to a certain extent): each character represents one word. The evolution of modern Mandarin Chinese was accompanied by a reduction in the total number of phonemes. Words which previously were phonetically distinct became homophones. Many disyllabic words in modern Mandarin are the result of joining two related words (such as péngyou, literally "friend-friend") in order  to resolve the phonetic ambiguity. A similar process is observed in some English dialects. For instance, in the Southern dialects of American English, it is not unusual for the short vowel sounds [ɪ] and [ɛ] to be indistinguishable before nasal consonants: thus the words "pen" and "pin" are homophones (see pin-pen merger). In these dialects, the ambiguity is often resolved by using the compounds "ink-pen" and "stick-pin", in order to clarify which "p*n" is being discussed.

Analytic
 English:
"He travelled by hovercraft on the sea" is largely isolating, but travelled (although it is possible to say "did travel" instead) and hovercraft each have two morphemes per word, the former being an example of relational synthesis (inflection), and the latter of compounding synthesis (a special case of derivation with another free morpheme instead of a bound one).

Rather synthetic
 Japanese:
  means strictly literally, "To us, these photos of a child crying are things that are difficult to be shown", meaning 'We cannot bear being shown these photos of a child crying' in more idiomatic English. In the example, most words have more than one morpheme and some have up to five.
Hebrew:
 . this sentence means "Yesterday I told my friends about the idea I was thinking about". From this example we can see that Hebrew verbs are conjugated by tense/mood and person (including gender and number). More at: Modern Hebrew grammar.

Very synthetic
 Finnish: 
Käyttäytyessään tottelemattomasti oppilas saa jälki-istuntoa 
"Should they behave in an insubordinate manner, the student will get detention." 
Structurally: behaviour (present/future tense) (of their) obey (without) (in the manner/style) studying (they who (should be)) gets detention (some). Practically every word is derived and/or inflected. However, this is quite formal language, and (especially in speech) would have various words replaced by more analytic structures: Kun oppilas käyttäytyy tottelemattomasti, hän saa jälki-istuntoa meaning 'When the student behaves in an insubordinate manner, they will get detention'.
 Georgian: 
 gadmogvakht'unebinebdneno (gad-mo-gv-a-kht'un-eb-in-eb-d-nen-o) 
'They said that they would be forced by them (the others) to make someone to jump over in this direction'. 
The word describes the whole sentence that incorporates tense, subject, direct and indirect objects, their plurality, relation between them, direction of the action, conditional and causative markers, etc.
 Classical Arabic: 
  
"And did we give it (masc.) to you futilely?" in Arabic, each word consists of one root that has a basic meaning (  'give' and   'futile'). Prefixes and suffixes are added to make the word incorporate subject, direct and indirect objects, number, gender, definiteness, etc.

Increase in analyticity
Haspelmath and Michaelis observed that analyticity is increasing in a number of European languages. In the German example, the first phrase makes use of inflection, but the second phrase uses a preposition. The development of preposition suggests the moving from synthetic to analytic.

It has been argued that analytic grammatical structures are easier for adults learning a foreign language. Consequently, a larger proportion of non-native speakers learning a language over the course of its historical development may lead to a simpler morphology, as the preferences of adult learners get passed on to second generation native speakers. This is especially noticeable in the grammar of creole languages. A 2010 paper in PLOS ONE suggests that evidence for this hypothesis can be seen in correlations between morphological complexity and factors such as the number of speakers of a language, geographic spread, and the degree of inter-linguistic contact.

According to Ghil'ad Zuckermann, Modern Hebrew (which he calls "Israeli") "is much more analytic, both with nouns and verbs", compared with Classical Hebrew (which he calls "Hebrew").

See also

Analytic language
Bound morpheme
Isolating language
Linguistic typology 
Morphological derivation
Morphology (linguistics)

References

External links
 SIL: What is a morphological process?
 SIL: What is derivation?
 SIL: Comparison of inflection and derivation
 Lexicon of Linguistics: Inflection, Derivation
 Lexicon of Linguistics: Base, Stem, Root
  , chapter 4 of Halvor Eifring & Rolf Theil: Linguistics for Students of Asian and African Languages

 

eo:Lingva tipologio#Sintezaj lingvoj